Andean potato mottle virus (APMoV) is a plant pathogenic virus of the family Comoviridae.

See also 

 Viral diseases of potato

External links
 ICTVdB—The Universal Virus Database: Andean potato mottle virus
 Family Groups—The Baltimore Method

Comoviruses
Viral plant pathogens and diseases